Polypoetes marginifer is a moth of the family Notodontidae. It is found in Peru.

References

Moths described in 1913
Notodontidae of South America